Appu and Pappu (alternatively titled Appu Pappu) is a 2010 Indian Kannada-language film directed by R Anantharaju, starring Snehith and an orangutan named Judi in the titular roles. This is the first Kannada film to feature an orangutan in a major role and is loosely based on the film Dunston Checks In (1996). The film was dubbed in Tamil as Appu Pappu.

Cast

 Snehith as Appu
 Judi as Pappu
 Abbas as Ramesh
 Komal as Animal trainer
 Rangayana Raghu as Jothish Chan
 Rekha Vedavyas as Deepa 
 Raju Talikote
 Madhuri Itagi
 Vijay Kumar
 Jim Ravi
 Jim Harish
 Jennifer Kotwal in a special appearance

Production 
The film was shot in Cambodia.

Music
The music of the film is composed by Hamsalekha. The makers of the film wanted Amitabh Bachchan to sing a song for the orangutan.

Reception

Critical response 

Shruti Indira Lakshminarayana from Rediff.com scored the film at 2.5 out of 5 stars and says "This being a children's film, the violent sequence could have been avoided. Certain provocative scenes involving the second lead heroine could also have been easily given a skip. Appu Pappu speaks of the importance of family values and ties on one hand, and animal welfare and protection on the other. A good outing for the kids". B. S. Srivani from Deccan Herald wrote "However, “Appu Pappu” is meant mainly for the kids, and their doting parents. When each trick, twist and turn featuring the human-animal duo gets seetis and loud applause, it is time to suspend logic and enjoy the show. “Appu Pappu” entertains as only it can". A critic from The Times of India scored the film at 3.5 out of 5 stars and wrote "Rekha excels with her graceful performance. Master Snehith promises to be a "little star" of the future. Komal is simply superb. Rangayana Raghu keeps you in good humour. Raju Thalikote, Abbas and Jennifer Kotwal have done justice to their roles. It is finally the orangutan that steals the show with a good performance. "Mungaru Male" Krishna is at his best in cinematography. Hamsalekha has given some excellent musical numbers".

Box office 
The film was a surprise box office success and ran for a hundred days.

References

2010s Kannada-language films
2010 films